Jill Ker Conway  (9 October 1934 – 1 June 2018) was an Australian-American scholar and author. Well known for her autobiographies, in particular her first memoir, The Road from Coorain, she also was Smith College's first woman president (1975–1985) and most recently served as a visiting professor at the Massachusetts Institute of Technology. In 2004 she was designated a Women's History Month Honoree by the National Women's History Project. She was a recipient of the National Humanities Medal.

Biography
Ker Conway was born in Hillston, New South Wales, in the outback of Australia. Together with her two brothers, Ker Conway was raised in near-total isolation on a family-owned  tract of land called Coorain (the aboriginal word for "windy place"), which eventually grew to encompass . On Coorain, she lived a lonely life, and grew up without playmates except for her brothers. In her early years, she was schooled entirely by her mother, with the aid of correspondence class material for her primary school and early grade school education.

Ker Conway spent her youth working the sheep station; by age seven, she was an important member of the workforce, helping with such activities as herding and tending the sheep, checking the perimeter fences and transporting heavy farm supplies. The farm prospered until it was crippled by a drought that lasted seven years. This and her father's worsening health put an increasing burden on her shoulders. When she was eleven, her father drowned in a diving accident while trying to extend the farm's water piping.

Initially Jill Ker Conway's mother, a nurse by profession, refused to leave Coorain. But after three more years of drought, she was compelled to move Jill and her brothers to Sydney, where the children attended school.

Ker Conway found the local state school a rough environment. The British manners and accent ingrained by her parents clashed with her peers' Australian habits, provoking taunts and jeers. This resulted in her mother enrolling her at Abbotsleigh, a private girls school, where Ker Conway found intellectual challenge and social acceptance. After finishing her education at Abbotsleigh, she enrolled at the University of Sydney, where she studied History and English and graduated with honours in 1958. Upon graduation, Ker Conway sought a trainee post in the Department of External Affairs, but the all-male committee turned down her application.

After this setback, she travelled through Europe with her now emotionally volatile mother. In 1960, she decided to strike out on her own and move to the United States. At age 25, she was accepted into the Harvard University history program. There she assisted a Canadian professor, John Conway, who became her husband until his death in 1995. Ker Conway received her Ph.D. at Harvard in 1969 and taught at the University of Toronto from 1964 to 1975. Her book True North details her life in Toronto.

From 1975 to 1985, Ker Conway was the president of Smith College. After 1985, she was a Visiting Professor at the Massachusetts Institute of Technology. She received thirty-eight honorary degrees and awards from North American and Australian colleges, universities and women's organizations.

Throughout her career, Ker Conway served as director on a variety of corporate boards. These include stints of more than a decade on the boards of Nike, Colgate-Palmolive, and Merrill Lynch.

After 2011, Ker Conway served as the Board Chair of Community Solutions. It is a non-profit organization with a focus on homelessness and related issues, based in New York City.

Conway died on 1 June 2018 at her home in Boston at the age of 83.

President of Smith College

In 1975, Ker Conway became the first female president of Smith College, the largest women's college in the United States. Located in Northampton, Massachusetts, Smith, a private liberal arts college, is the only women's college in the U.S. to grant its own degrees in engineering.

Ker Conway launched the Ada Comstock Scholars program, initially proposed by her predecessor Thomas Mendenhall. This program allows non-traditional students, many with work and family obligations, to study full or part-time, depending on their family and work schedules. These women can take classes for a bachelor's degree over a longer period of time. Conway House, dedicated in 2006, a residence for Ada Comstock Scholars was named in honor of Ker Conway.

One of Ker Conway's more notable accomplishments is a program she initiated to help Ada Comstock Scholars on welfare. At the time, many students who were also welfare mothers were not pursuing higher education, as accepting a scholarship would cause them to lose their welfare benefits. The mothers were forced to choose between supporting their children or furthering their education. By not giving them scholarships but paying their rent instead, Ker Conway circumvented the state's system. She also gave the students access to an account at local stores, access to physicians and so on. ABC's Good Morning America profiled graduates of the program, giving it national exposure. Eventually the state of Massachusetts, convinced about the importance of the program, changed its welfare system so that scholarship students wouldn't lose their benefits.

She also led the creation of the Smith Management Program (now called Smith Executive Education) and the Project on Women and Social Change. She worked to expand the curriculum leading to the development of programs in women's studies, comparative literature, and engineering. Conway took a keen interest in fundraising and under her presidency the endowment nearly tripled from $82 million to $222 million. These efforts enabled several large-scale projects including the construction of the Ainsworth Gymnasium, and expansion of the Neilson Library. The Career Development Office was also expanded under her tenure to better educate alumnae about career opportunities and graduate training.

In 1975, Jill Ker Conway was named by Time as a Woman of the Year.

The Road from Coorain

Ker Conway started writing her first memoir after leaving Smith College, during her period at MIT. The Road from Coorain was published in 1989 and details her early life, from Coorain in Australia to Harvard in the United States.

The book begins with her early childhood at the remote sheep station Coorain near Mossgiel, New South Wales. Ker Conway writes about her teenage years in Sydney and especially her education at the University of Sydney, where university studies were open to women but the culture was focused heavily on the men. She describes her intellectual development and later her feelings when she realizes that there is a bias against women; based upon her sex, she is denied a traineeship at the Australian foreign service.

In 2001, Chapman Pictures produced a television film, The Road from Coorain, featuring Katherine Slattery as the grown-up Jill and Juliet Stevenson as her mother.

Awards and honors

 1960 Jill Ker Conway was a 1960 Fulbright Postgraduate Scholar in History from the University of Sydney to Harvard University.
 1975 In the first year of her presidency at Smith College, Conway was named a "woman of the year", one of a small group of notable women selected for that award by Time magazine.
 1989 L.L. Winship/PEN New England Award, The Road from Coorain
 Ker Conway was appointed a Companion (AC) in the General Division of the Order of Australia on 10 June 2013 for her eminent service to the community, particularly women, as an author, academic and through leadership roles with corporations, foundations, universities and philanthropic groups. On 12 June, she was removed as a 'Companion' and invested as an 'Honorary Companion' of the Order of Australia, because she no longer held Australian citizenship.
On July 10, 2013, she received a 2012 National Humanities Medal from President Barack Obama.

Legacy
In 2017 the John and Jill Ker Conway residence for veterans was opened in Washington DC.

Selected bibliography

Books
 
 
 
 
 
 Reprinted as:

Chapters in books

Journal articles
  
  Pdf.

References

External links
 
 
 National Women's History Project - Jill Ker Conway biography
 Jill Ker Conway: A Life
 Penguin Randomhouse Books - Jill Ker Conway
 A Woman's Education by Jill Ker Conway
 
 Excerpts from The Road from Coorain
 
 Masterpiece Theatre - The Road from Coorain, aired May 13, 2008 
 
 Booknotes interview with Ker Conway on When Memory Speaks: Reflections on Autobiography, May 24, 1998.

1934 births
2018 deaths
Honorary Companions of the Order of Australia
American historians
American memoirists
Australian emigrants to the United States
People with acquired American citizenship
Harvard University alumni
Massachusetts Institute of Technology faculty
Nike, Inc. people
University of Sydney alumni
Academic staff of the University of Toronto
National Humanities Medal recipients
American women historians
Presidents of Smith College
Women heads of universities and colleges
American women memoirists
People educated at Abbotsleigh
21st-century American women